State Route 212 (SR-212) was a state highway in the U.S. state of Utah. Spanning just , it served as a minor arterial road connecting Interstate 15 (I-15) with the city of Washington.

Route description
SR-212 began at the northwest frontage road of I-15 of the Washington interchange. From there, it crossed southeasterly under the Interstate via a single-point urban interchange. Just  later, the route turned left onto Telegraph Street, traveling northeast through a built-up area of restaurants and retail stores. A short distance later, the route curved to the east along State Street through the center of Washington, passing public pocket parks, a post office, and the city museum before ending at its intersection with 300 East.

History
When SR-212 was created in 1941, it followed a different route through the area. Originally, SR-1 ran east–west through the city of Washington along State Street and Telegraph Street, where SR-212 is now.

In 1964, with the completion of I-15 just north of State Street through Washington, the Utah State Road Commission realigned SR-1 to follow the Interstate while SR-212 was extended from its northern terminus westward along former SR-1 to the new Washington interchange. This eastward extension became the entirety of SR-212 after the old alignment of the route south from Washington was withdrawn by the state in 1969. The route remained unchanged until 1992, when its eastern end was extended one block east. It was later removed from the state highway system in 2012.

Major intersections

References

212 (1941-2012)
 212
Streets in Utah
2012 disestablishments in Utah